Army Medical College Bogura (AMCB) is a Military medical college, established in 2014. It is located in Bogra Cantonment, Bangladesh. It is affiliated with Bangladesh University of Professionals. Academic activities began on 10 January 2015 with 50 students along with 4 Army Medical Colleges (Chittagong, Rangpur, Cumilla & Jessore). In 2018 it has 200 MBBS students (4th Batch running).

It offers a five-year course of study leading to a Bachelor of Medicine, Bachelor of Surgery (MBBS) degree. A one-year internship after graduation is compulsory for all graduates. The degree is recognised by the Bangladesh Medical and Dental Council.

References

External links
 

Medical colleges in Bangladesh
Hospitals in Bangladesh
Educational institutions established in 2014
2014 establishments in Bangladesh
Bogura District